Lambis Livieratos (born 3 April 1966), is a Greek singer and actor from Athens, Greece.

Life and career

Early years 1987-1992
In 1987, Lambis graduated from Drama School of G. Theodosiadis. His first theatrical performance as an actor was during the winter of 1988 in a play called Xenodohio O Paradisos (Paradise Hotel). Two years later, he got his first leading roles by playing in various theater and TV productions. He made his first musical attempt in 1992 singing live at a night club on the side of Giorgos Marinos. His first appearance in discography was with his participation in Thanos Kalliris' record with the song "O Neos Ine Oreos" and a guest appearance in Alexis Papadimitriou's record with the track "O Kyklos Tou Erota" (The Circle of Love).

In 1993, he released his first album, As eixa ti dinami, with Sony Music. In 1994, he released his second album,Ypothesi prosopiki.

The Golden Time 1996-1999

In his 3rd album Bam kai Kato (1996) he makes a smash hit with the title track written by Natalia Germanou and composed by Nikos Karvelas. The song "Skorpia Zoi", with music and lyrics by Lambis Livieratos, is also included in the album which was also his first Golden one with over 50,000 sales.

Lambis composed most of the tracks on his next album To kalitero pedi (The best kid) and collaborated with lyricists Natalia Germanou, Antonis Pappas, Yiorgos Laskaris, Konstantinos Tseronis, and Natassa Theodoridou.

He appeared in many big music shows in Greece singing with some of the most famous Greek artists such as Anna Vissi, Yiannis Parios, Vassilis Karras, Kaiti Garbi, Despina Vandi, Giorgos Mazonakis, Antonis Remos and Marinella.

In the season 1996–1997, while Antonis Remos was making his debut, they had a huge success in Athens singing together in the club "Thalassies Hantres" in Thisio.

In 1999, he married a Greek fashion model, Evi Adam on the island of Ios. They have two daughters, Danae and Nefeli. They divorced in 2010.

The Millennium years

In the year 2000, he voiced Tarzan in the Greek dub of the same title animated film.

In his last album, Den Yparho Makria sou (2003), he sang a duet with his then wife Evi Adam called "Paradeise Mou" which also went up on the charts.

In 2006, he played two leading roles, one in the ANT1 TV series Ela na agapithoume and one in the theatrical play Funny with Mimi Denissi.

In 2010, he took part in the theatrical musical MARINELLA THE MUSICAL in Thessaloniki Concert Hall with Marinella on the leading role.
 
Since 2014, he has performed in live shows with his band all over Greece and abroad.

In 2020, he took part on the famous TV show in Greece, Your Face Sounds Familiar on ANT1 TV.

Discography
1993 – Ας Είχα Τη Δύναμη / As Eiha Ti Dynami
1994 – Χριστούγεννα Χωρίς Εσένα / Hristougenna Horis Esena
1994 – Υπόθεση Προσωπική / Ypothesi Prosopiki
1996 – Μπαμ Και Κάτω / Bam Kai Kato
1997 – Το Τεράστιο Κίτρινο Πράγμα / To Terastio Kitrino Pragma
1998 – Ποιός Είναι Αυτός; / Poios Einai Autos;
1998 – Ρόδα Είναι… / Roda Einai…
1999 – Το Καλύτερο Παιδί / To Kalytero Paidi
2000 – Το Μάθημα / To Mathima
2000 – Λάμπεις Μωρό Μου / Labis Moro Mou
2001 – Έλα / Ela2002 – Λίγο Πρίν / Ligo Prin2003 – Δεν Υπάρχω Μακριά Σου /  Den Yparho Makria Sou2003 – Οι Μεγαλύτερες Επιτυχίες / Oi Megalyteres Epityhies2008 – Χρυσές Επιτυχίες / Hrises EpityhiesSingles
2011 – Επιστροφή Στις Ρίζες / Epistrofi Stis Rizes2015 – Δε Το Χωράει Ο Νους / De To Horaei O Nous2016 – Μία Κι Έξω / Mia Ki Exo2018 – Ο Έρωτας / O Erotas2019 – Σε Παντρεύομαι Χτες / Se Pantreuomai Htes2021 – 15 Γράμματα / 15 Grammata2021 – Κάπου Κάπου Να Θυμάσαι / Kapou Kapou Na ThymasaiDuet
1993 – Ο Παλιός Είναι Αλλιώς / O Palios Einai Allios (ft. Thanos Kalliris)
1998 – Δυο Άγνωστοι /	Dyo Anagnosti (ft. Stella Kalatzi)
2000 — Ο Τρόπος / O Tropos (ft. Natassa Theodoridou)
2001 – Eσύ / Esy (ft. Theano)
2003 – Παραδεισέ Μου / Paradeise Mou (ft. Eui Adam)
2015 – Γύρισε Ξανά / Gyrise Xana'' (ft. Bo)

External links
Official Site
Lampis Livieratos on Last fm

20th-century Greek male singers
Greek laïko singers  
Greek male voice actors
Living people
Sony Music Greece artists
Singers from Athens
1966 births
21st-century Greek male singers
Actors from Athens